Gagliardi is an Italian surname. Notable people with the surname include:

 Achille Gagliardi (1537–1607), Italian ascetic writer and spiritual director
 Alejandro Gagliardi (born 1989), Argentine footballer 
 Alyssa Gagliardi, American-born women’s ice hockey player
 Bernardino Gagliardi (1609-1660), Italian painter 
 Domenico Gagliardi (c. 1660 – c. 1735), Italian anatomist
 Ed Gagliardi (1952–2014), American bass guitarist
 Filippo Gagliardi (1606–1659), Italian painter of the Baroque period
 Francesco Gagliardi (Director) (born 1974), Italian film director, screenwriter and film producer
 Francesco Gagliardi (Coach) (born 1947), Italian football coach
 Francesco Gagliardi (Cognitive Scientist), Italian cognitive scientist and philosopher
 Frank Gagliardi (1931–2011), American jazz drummer and percussionist
 Emmanuelle Gagliardi (born 1976), retired professional Swiss tennis player
 John Gagliardi (disambiguation), multiple people
 Laura Gagliardi, Italian theoretical and computational chemist
 Laurent Gagliardi (born 1948), Canadian screenwriter and film director
 Lee Parsons Gagliardi (1918–1998), federal judge for the United States District Court
 Pat Gagliardi (born 1950), Democratic member of the Michigan House of Representatives from 1983 through 1998
 Peppino Gagliardi (born 1940), Italian singer
 Pietro Gagliardi (1809–1890), Italian painter and architect
 Richard Gagliardi, retired American ice hockey player and coach
 Roberto Gagliardi, Italian-born art dealer based in London
 Rosario Gagliardi (1698–1762), Italian architect
 Sara Gagliardi (born 1958), legislator in the U.S. state of Colorado

Other
 Gagliardi Trophy

Italian-language surnames